Events in the year 1996 in Brazil.

Incumbents

Federal government
 President: Fernando Henrique Cardoso
 Vice President: Marco Maciel

Governors 
 Acre: Orleir Messias Cameli 
 Alagoas: Divaldo Suruagy 
 Amapa: João Capiberibe
 Amazonas: Amazonino Mendes
 Bahia: Paulo Souto
 Ceará: Tasso Jereissati 
 Espírito Santo: Vitor Buaiz 
 Goiás: Maguito Vilela
 Maranhão: Roseana Sarney
 Mato Grosso: Dante de Oliveira
 Mato Grosso do Sul: Wilson Barbosa Martins
 Minas Gerais: Eduardo Brandão Azeredo 
 Pará: Almir Gabriel 
 Paraíba: José Maranhão 
 Paraná: Jaime Lerner 
 Pernambuco: Miguel Arraes 
 Piauí: Mão Santa
 Rio de Janeiro: Marcello Alencar
 Rio Grande do Norte: Garibaldi Alves Filho 
 Rio Grande do Sul: Antônio Britto 
 Rondônia: Valdir Raupp de Mattos 
 Roraima: Neudo Ribeiro Campos 
 Santa Catarina: Paulo Afonso Vieira 
 São Paulo: Mário Covas 
 Sergipe: Albano Franco 
 Tocantins: José Wilson Siqueira Campos

Vice governors
 Acre: Labib Murad 
 Alagoas: Manuel Gomes de Barros
 Amapá: Antônio Hildegardo Gomes de Alencar 
 Amazonas: Alfredo Pereira do Nascimento 
 Bahia: César Borges 
 Ceará: Moroni Bing Torgan 
 Espírito Santo: José Renato Casagrande 
 Goiás: Naphtali Alves de Souza 
 Maranhão: José Reinaldo Carneiro Tavares 
 Mato Grosso: José Márcio Panoff de Lacerda 
 Mato Grosso do Sul: Braz Melo (until 3 May); vacant (starting 3 May)
 Minas Gerais: Walfrido Silvino dos Mares Guia Neto 
 Pará: Hélio Mota Gueiros Júnior 
 Paraíba: vacant
 Paraná: Emília de Sales Belinati 
 Pernambuco: Jorge José Gomes 
 Piauí: Osmar Antônio de Araújo 
 Rio de Janeiro: Luiz Paulo Correa da Rocha 
 Rio Grande do Norte: Fernando Freire 
 Rio Grande do Sul: Vicente Joaquim Bogo 
 Rondônia: Aparício Carvalho de Moraes 
 Roraima: Airton Antonio Soligo 
 Santa Catarina: José Augusto Hülse 
 São Paulo: Geraldo Alckmin 
 Sergipe: José Carlos Machado 
 Tocantins: Raimundo Nonato Pires dos Santos

Events

Births

 February 8 – Isadora Williams, figure skater
 May 6 –  Valesca Machado, mixed martial artist
 July 9 – Rafael Miguel, actor (d. 2019)

Deaths

See also 
1996 in Brazilian football
1996 in Brazilian television

References

 
1990s in Brazil
Years of the 20th century in Brazil
Brazil
Brazil